Kamal Bashir (born 13 December 1988) is a Bermudian cricketer. He was named in Bermuda's squad for the 2013 ICC World Twenty20 Qualifier tournament. He made his Twenty20 debut during the tournament, against Nepal, on 23 November 2013.

References

External links
 

1988 births
Living people
Bermudian cricketers
Place of birth missing (living people)